The children of Palhavã (Portuguese Meninos de Palhavã) were three male natural sons of King John V of Portugal (1706–1750), which were recognised by the monarch in a document issued in 1742, which was published only after the death of the king, in 1752.

The expression comes from the fact these three children had lived in the palace of the Marquis of Louriçal, in the Palhavã area, in those times outside Lisbon. Today, this building is within the city limits and it is occupied by the Spanish Embassy as the House of the Spanish Ambassador.

The children had a remarkable education in the Santa Cruz Monastery, in Coimbra. Their master was Friar Gaspar da Encarnação, who educated them as religious men according to the late King's wishes. 

The three children of Palhavã were:
Anthony (D. António) (1714–1800) - his mother was a French woman named Luísa Inês Antónia Machado Monteiro. He became Doctor in Theology and later knight of the Order of Christ.
Casper (D. Gaspar) (1716–1789) - his mother was Madalena Máxima de Miranda, a nun. He became archbishop of Braga.
Joseph (D. José) (1720–1801) - his mother was Mother Paula, abbess of the Monastery of Saint Denis of Odivelas. He became General Inquisitor of Portugal.

Despite being King Joseph I's half brothers, Anthony and Joseph were exiled to Buçaco in 1760 due to a conflict with the Marquis of Pombal, the all-mighty prime minister. They were allowed to return to the Court only after the king's death, in 1777.

Sources

See also
John V of Portugal
Joseph I of Portugal
Marquis of Pombal
Archdiocese of Braga

Dukes of Braganza
House of Braganza
Illegitimate children of John V of Portugal